Kwilu Ngongo Sugar Refinery (KNSR) (French: (Sucrerei du Kwilu Ngongo), is a sugar manufacturing company in the Democratic Republic of the Congo. The sugar mill produces crystalline table sugar and maintains a distillery that manufactures rum under the brand Kwilu Rum. It is the oldest sugar mill in the country, having been established in 1925.

Location
The headquarters of the company and its main factory are located in the town of Kwilu Ngongo, in Kongo Central Province (formerly Bas Zaire Province), in the southeastern part of DR Congo, close to the international order with Angola.

The geographical coordinates of Kwilu Ngongo Sugar Refinery are: 05°30'36.0"S, 14°42'16.0"E (Latitude:-5.510000; Longitude:14.704444).

Overview
The sugar factory which was established in 1925, is the oldest  sugar mill in the Democratic Republic of the Congo. It is also the largest, by sugar output, contributing 63,400 metric tons of finished product annually in 1990. At that time, it accounted for 66 percent of the county's domestic sugar output, on an annual basis. Between 1996 and 2021, it was the only functional sugar manufacturer in the county as both Lotokila Sugar Refinery and South Kivu Sugar Refinery were shut down.

As of 2019, KNSR had  of cane under cultivation. Each  yielded 70 tons of raw cane on average. The refinery had crushing capacity of 5,500 tons of raw cane per day. At that time sugar production was 69,811 tons annually.

Ownership
The sugar refinery and embedded alcohol distillery are co-owned by the Government of the Democratic Republic of the Congo and a private conglomerate known as Finasucre, based in Belgium, with operations globally. The two shareholders established a special purpose joint venture company called Compagnie Sucrière Kwilu Ngongo, which owns and operates the business. The table below illustrates the shareholding in the stock of Compagnie Sucrière Kwilu Ngongo.

Kwilu Ngongo Distillery
Embedded within the sugar refinery is the Kwilu Ngongo Distillery, which produces Kwilu Rum. The distillery is owned and operated by the sugar mill.

See also
 Economy of the Democratic Republic of the Congo
 List of sugar manufacturers in the Democratic Republic of the Congo

References

External links
Chronology of Finasucre Group: 1886 - 2010

Food and drink companies established in 1925
1925 establishments in the Belgian Congo
Kongo Central
Sugar companies of the Democratic Republic of the Congo
Manufacturing companies of the Democratic Republic of the Congo